Fog City is a nickname for San Francisco. The term can further refer to:

 Fog City Records, a San Francisco-based record label
 General fogginess of a city